To commemorate the achievements of Karen Spärck Jones, the Karen Spärck Jones Award was created in 2008 by the British Computer Society (BCS) and its Information Retrieval Specialist Group (BCS IRSG), which is sponsored by Microsoft Research. 

The winner of the award is invited to present a keynote talk at the European Conference on Information Retrieval (ECIR) the following year.

Chronological recipients and keynote talks
 2009: Mirella Lapata  : “Image and Natural Language Processing for Multimedia Information Retrieval” 
 2010: Evgeniy Gabrilovich  : “Ad Retrieval Systems in vitro and in vivo: Knowledge-Based Approaches to Computational Advertising” 
 2011: No award was made
 2012: Diane Kelly  : “Contours and Convergence” 
 2013: Eugene Agichtein  : “Inferring Searcher Attention and Intention by Mining Behavior Data”
 2014: Ryen White  : “Mining and Modeling Online Health Search” 
 2015: Jordan Boyd-Graber  : “Opening up the Black Box: Interactive Machine Learning for Understanding Large Document Collections, Characterizing Social Science, and Language-Based Games”, Emine Yilmaz : “A Task-Based Perspective to Information Retrieval” 
 2016: Jaime Teevan : “Search, Re-Search.” 
 2017: Fernando Diaz (computer scientist) : “The Harsh Reality of Production Information Access Systems” 
 2018: Krisztian Balog : “On Entities and Evaluation” 
 2019: Chirag Shah : “Task-Based Intelligent Retrieval and Recommendation” 
 2020: Ahmed H. Awadallah : “Learning with Limited Labeled Data: The Role of User Interactions” 
 2021: Ivan Vulić : “Towards Language Technology for a Truly Multilingual World?”

References

Computer science awards